Georges Mesmin (15 November 1926 – 25 April 2019) was a French politician who served as member of the National Assembly and mayor of the 16th arrondissement of Paris between 1983 and 1989.

References

1926 births
2019 deaths
People from Juvisy-sur-Orge
Politicians from Île-de-France
Mayors of arrondissements of Paris
Union for French Democracy politicians
Sciences Po alumni
École nationale d'administration alumni
Inspection générale des finances (France)